Mitimiti is a small settlement in Northland, New Zealand.  It lies close to the Warawara Forest, between the mouths of the Whangape Harbour and Hokianga Harbour on Northland's west coast, 44 km west of Kohukohu. Mitimiti is part of the Hokianga North statistical area. For demographics of this area, see Panguru.

Name
There are several stories about the origin of the name Mitimiti.

The name "Mitimiti" is thought to come from a Māori term meaning "to lick", a reference to the belief that the souls of the dead, on their way to Cape Reinga, paused here to drink at the mouth of the Mitimiti Stream.

Another story is that the great chief More Te Korohanga was slain in a battle there. The warriors wanted a piece of the chief, but there wasn't enough of his body for everyone, so they licked his blood from the rocks there.

History

SS Ventnor
On 27 October 1902, the SS Ventnor sank near the Hokianga Heads.  The ship was carrying the remains of 499 Chinese miners back to China,  however, none of the Chinese bodies were recovered initially.

For weeks and months following the wreck, bones washed ashore along the Hokianga, including on the beach at Mitimiti. Locals, unsure of the origins of the bones, buried them in their cemeteries.  In 2007, Chinese settlers began to make links between the story of the SS Ventnor and the bones, and official relationships between Te Rarawa and The New Zealand Chinese Association were formed. 

In 2013, a memorial gateway was unveiled in the cemetery in Mitimiti,  to honor the sinking. It was blessed by both Māori and Chinese

Marae

The local Matihetihe Marae is affiliated with the Te Rarawa hapū of Taomaui. The name Matihetihe is reference to the tihetihe, or tumble weeds that grow on the sanddunes.

The marae complex consists of a wharenui named Tūmoana after the captain of the Tinana canoe, and a wharekai named Nga Ringa Rau o Te Akau (The many hands on the shore). Next to the marae complex is Hato Hemi a catholic church. Above the marae on a hill sits the wahi tapu (cemetery) named Hione.

In February 2015 the marae was chosen to be part of TV3's Marae DIY. The wharenui was completely refurbished on the show. At the same time, the marae was connected to fibre broadband, in a project named Mititmiti on the Grid.

In October 2020, the Government committed $1,407,731 from the Provincial Growth Fund to upgrade the marae and 8 other Te Rarawa marae, creating 100 jobs.

Education
Matihetihe School is a coeducational full primary (years 1–8) school with a roll of  students as of  The school was founded in 1890, and was initially a part-time Native School taught at the Matihetihe whare.

Notable people
Artist Ralph Hotere was born in Mitimiti in 1931, and was buried there in 2013. He also attended Matihetihe school. 

Poet Hone Tuwhare wrote poem A fall of rain at Mitimiti: Hokianga which was published in 1974 in his collection Something Nothing.

References

Populated places in the Northland Region
Hokianga
Far North District